Roman Volkov (born 8 January 1987) is a Belarusian footballer who plays for Dnepr Mogilev.

Honours
Minsk
Belarusian Cup: 2012–13

Sfântul Gheorghe Suruceni
 Moldovan Cup: 2020–21
 Moldovan Super Cup: 2021

External links
 
 

1987 births
Living people
People from Navapolatsk
Sportspeople from Vitebsk Region
Belarusian footballers
Association football forwards
Belarusian expatriate footballers
Expatriate footballers in Moldova
Belarusian expatriate sportspeople in Moldova
Moldovan Super Liga players
FC SKVICH Minsk players
FC Naftan Novopolotsk players
FC Granit Mikashevichi players
FC Belshina Bobruisk players
FC Volna Pinsk players
FC Slavia Mozyr players
FC Minsk players
FC Isloch Minsk Raion players
FC Vitebsk players
FC Gomel players
FC Gorodeya players
FC Sfîntul Gheorghe players
FC Dnepr Mogilev players